Nikola Tasić (born 17 January 1992) is a Serbian footballer who plays as a centre-back for Brodarac.

Club career
Born in Belgrade, Tasić started his senior career with Železnik in 2010. Later he joined Serbian First League side Dinamo Vranje, where he stayed until 2011, missing some period because of injury. Later he also played with Balkan Mirijevo, Čukarički, Radnički Nova Pazova and Almeboda Linneryd in Sweden. In summer 2015, Tasić signed with Sloboda Užice. Next summer, Tasić signed a two-year professional contract with Jagodina.

References

External links
 

1992 births
Living people
Footballers from Belgrade
Association football midfielders
Serbian footballers
Serbian expatriate footballers
FK Železnik players
FK Balkan Mirijevo players
FK Dinamo Vranje players
FK Čukarički players
FK Radnički Nova Pazova players
FK Sloboda Užice players
FK Jagodina players
FC Kyzylzhar players
FK Borac Čačak players
OFK Žarkovo players
Navbahor Namangan players
FK Brodarac players
Serbian SuperLiga players
Serbian First League players
Uzbekistan Super League players
Serbian expatriate sportspeople in Sweden
Serbian expatriate sportspeople in Kazakhstan
Serbian expatriate sportspeople in Uzbekistan
Expatriate footballers in Sweden
Expatriate footballers in Kazakhstan
Expatriate footballers in Uzbekistan